Naya Din Nai Raat is a 1974 Indian Hindi-language drama film directed by A. Bhimsingh. The film is a remake of 1964 Tamil movie Navarathri starring Sivaji Ganesan which was also previously in Telugu in 1966 as Navaratri starring Akkineni Nageswara Rao. This film had enhanced Sanjeev Kumar's status and reputation as an actor in Hindi cinema. The nine roles played by Sanjeev Kumar correspond to nine Rasa.

Plot
Sushma believes that she is too young to get married, but her father, Lalla Banarsilal insists, and she runs away. Her adventures take her to a lonely wealthy widower with a cute daughter named Guddi; a drunken lout in a brothel; Dr. Kruparam, a psychiatrist, who admits her in his mental hospital; a dreaded bandit who has killed his tormentor, cut him into pieces and fed them to birds, and who still on a killing spree; Pandit Gorakhnath who lives a double life - as a priest and as a smuggler; a leper Dhanraj, who once was a very wealthy man, but is now shunned by everyone; a transvestite stage actor; and a hunter who saves Sushma's life by shooting dead a man-eating lion. As things spiral out of control for Sushma, there is yet one more male she has to meet, and it is this meeting that will change her life even more.

Cast
Sanjeev Kumar as Anand/(Swami Rahasyanand/Mr. Sarang/Seth Dhanraj/Sher Singh/Phoolkumar/Four Other Roles
Jaya Bhaduri as Sushma
Nazneen
Farida Jalal  
Om Prakash as Lala Banarsilal
David as Seth Ram Shankar
Shyama as Brothel Madam
Lalita Pawar 
Tun Tun 
Manorama

Soundtrack
All songs were penned by Rajendra Krishan.

Production
The lead role was initially offered to Dilip Kumar but he declined the role and suggested Sanjeev Kumar's name. His suggestion was taken and the role went to him.

References

External links
 

1974 films
1970s Hindi-language films
1974 drama films
Films directed by A. Bhimsingh
Films scored by Laxmikant–Pyarelal
Hindi remakes of Tamil films